Dwain Weston (31 January 1973 –  5 October 2003) was an Australian skydiver, BASE jumper and wingsuiter. On 5 October 2003, at the end of the inaugural Go Fast Games, Weston was killed while attempting to fly over the Royal Gorge Bridge near Cañon City, Colorado, United States.

BASE jumping career 
Weston, who was originally from Sydney, Australia, worked as a software developer and was a skilled gymnast and surfer. In 2002, he won the world title in BASE jumping. He served as president of the Australian BASE Association (ABA). He was among the first BASE jumpers to introduce acrobatic elements into the jumps, and was a pioneer of various jumping techniques. Shortly before his death, Weston was hired by Boeing Defense, Space & Security for classified work developing satellite software.

Death 

On 5 October 2003, at the end of the inaugural Go Fast Games, Weston was killed while attempting to fly over the Royal Gorge Bridge near Cañon City, Colorado. Weston was wearing a wingsuit, a skydiving suit with fabric extended below the arms to the body and between the legs to catch air allowing for horizontal travel when skydiving. Weston was to go over the bridge while fellow skydiver Jeb Corliss was to go under it. Just prior to the jump, Weston said to Corliss, "Just remember: whatever happens, happens."

Miscalculating the winds and his distance from the bridge, Weston struck a railing while traveling at an estimated , severing one of his legs. Spectators on the bridge witnessed and filmed the event, capturing the reaction of the crowd and the damage to the bridge.

Prizes 
 World BASE Cup 2002 (Kuala Lumpur, Malaysia)
 Xtreme Skydive - World Base Cup 2003 Championship (Kuala Lumpur, Malaysia, 6 January 2003)

References

External links 
 

1973 births
2003 deaths
Australian computer programmers
Australian gymnasts
Australian skydivers
Australian surfers
Filmed deaths in sports
Place of birth missing
Sports deaths in Colorado
Sportsmen from New South Wales
Sportspeople from Sydney
Wingsuit flight deaths
Australian expatriate sportspeople in the United States